Fordham is an English surname. The name "Fordham" derives from the Anglo-Saxon (Old English) words ford, meaning a ford, and ham[m], which means a low-lying meadow by a source of water. Taken together, the name means a ford by a settlement or a wading place.

Notable people
Alan Fordham (born 1964), English cricketer
Andy Fordham (1962–2021), English darts player
Ben Fordham, Australian journalist
Debra Fordham, American television producer and writer
Elias Pym Fordham (1787–?), English-born surveyor of Indianapolis
Elijah Fordham (1798–1879), member of The Church of Jesus Christ of Latter-day Saints
Herbert Fordham (1854–1929), English cartographer
Julia Fordham (born 1962), English singer-songwriter
John Fordham (1388–1425), Bishop of Ely
John Fordham, British jazz critic 
Kirk Fordham, American political campaign manager
Michael Fordham (1905–1995), English psychiatrist
Montague Fordham (1864–1948), British agriculturalist
Robert Fordham (born 1942), Australian politician
Sharon Fordham, American Broadway theatrical producer
Ted Fordham (born 1940), former Australian rules footballer
Todd Fordham (born 1973), retired American Football player
Tom Fordham (born 1974), retired American Major League baseball player

References